Corruption in Denmark is amongst the lowest in the world. According to the 2021 Corruption Perceptions Index from Transparency International, Denmark scored 90 on a scale from 0 ("highly corrupt") to 100 ("very clean"). When ranked by score, Denmark shared first place with Finland and New Zealand among the 180 countries in the Index, where the country or countries ranked first are perceived to have the most honest public sector.  For comparison, the worst score was 12 (ranked 180).  The International Consortium of Investigative Journalists reported in 2014 that Denmark has consistently been in the top-4 since the publication of the first Corruption Perceptions Index report in 1995. 

Moreover, Transparency International's Global Corruption Barometer 2013 shows that the public does not consider corruption a major problem in Danish society, and bribes paid to access public benefits and services are virtually non-existent. 

The business environment regarding the ethical behaviour of companies' interaction with public officials, politicians and other enterprises, as well as the financial auditing and reporting standards among companies, are very strong, according to the Global Competitiveness Report 2013–2014.

The OECD has pointed out in 2013, though, that it had "serious concerns about the lack of enforcement" of bribery paid by Danish companies abroad.

See also 
 Crime in Denmark
 Danske Bank money laundering scandal
 Peter Brixtofte

References

External links
Denmark Corruption Profile from the Business Anti-Corruption Portal

Denmark
Crime in Denmark by type
Politics of Denmark